Black, Manafort, Stone and Kelly (often simply Black, Manafort) was a lobbying firm based in Washington, D.C. and formed in 1980 by Roger Stone, Paul Manafort and Charles Black.

History 
As Black, Manafort & Stone, the firm was one of the first political consulting groups to work for Ronald Reagan's presidential candidacy in 1980, and would later also have extensive connections to the presidential administrations of George H. W. Bush and Bill Clinton. Donald Trump was this firm's first client.

In 1984 it was renamed to Black, Manafort, Stone and Kelly (BMSK) & associates, after Peter G. Kelly was recruited.

The firm has represented, and lobbied the US Congress on behalf of, numerous foreign governments and heads of state from both representative democracies and unelected dictatorships including Mohamed Siad Barre of Somalia, dictator Ferdinand Marcos of the Philippines, dictator Mobutu Sese Seko of Zaire, and Jonas Savimbi of Angola. According to "The Torturer's Lobby", a report published by The Center for Public Integrity, the firm received $3.3 million in the early 1990s for their work with dictators.

During the 1988 presidential campaign in the United States, it was disclosed that Black, Manafort retained the island nation of the Bahamas as a client at a time its leadership was being attacked for alleged ties to drug traffickers. BMSK officials insisted that they intended only to help the Bahamas obtain more United States aid for efforts to curb drug smugglers.

On January 1, 1991, BMSK was acquired by Burson-Marsteller who between 1989 and 1994 had acquired Gold & Liebengood which was founded by Martin B. Gold and Howard Scholer Liebengood in 1984. BMSK merged with Gold & Liebengood to form BKSH & Associates in 1996.

According to Mustafa Nayyem in 2007, the Saint Petersburg office of BMSK was headed by Leonid Avrashov who, according to Serhiy Leshchenko in 2017, also had a credit card with Rinat Akhmetov's First Ukrainian International Bank (PUMB).

Domestically the firm represented Bethlehem Steel and Tobacco Institute, helped elect Senators Phil Gramm, Jesse Helms, Charles McCurdy Mathias Jr., Arlen Specter, Paula Hawkins and David F. Durenberger—and worked on legislation that benefitted the firm's clients.

Both Paul Manafort and Roger Stone worked on and held important positions in the 2016 presidential campaign of Donald Trump. Stone was convicted of seven felony charges due to his work on the Trump campaign.

Personnel

Principals
 Charles R. Black Jr.
 Paul J. Manafort
 Roger J. Stone
 Peter G. Kelly
 R. Scott Pastrick
 James C. Healey, Jr.

Others
 Lee Atwater became a senior partner in the political-consulting function of the firm (the partners claimed the firm kept political and lobbying functions separate) the day after President Reagan defeated Walter F. Mondale in 1984.

See also
Angolan Civil War
Lobbying in the United States

References

External links
 Black, Manafort, Stone, Kelly at SourceWatch

1980 establishments in Washington, D.C.
1996 disestablishments in Washington, D.C.
American companies disestablished in 1996
American companies established in 1980
Lobbying firms